Stanislas François (born 1 April 1873, date of death unknown) was a French fencer. He competed in the men's épée event at the 1900 Summer Olympics.

References

External links
 

1873 births
Year of death missing
French male épée fencers
Olympic fencers of France
Fencers at the 1900 Summer Olympics
Fencers from Paris
Place of death missing